Wakil (Arabic: وكيل, wakīl) is the Arabic word for an advocate, agent, and a trustee. The latter meaning, along with the name Disposer of affairs, is used as one of the names of God in the Qur'an. Al-Wakil is usually considered the 52nd or the 53rd name of God and it is mentioned in Qur'an multiple times (for example 3:173). In Islam, God is considered the supreme trustee, who can be relied upon to manage all of the affairs perfectly.

The root w-k-l bares meanings of entrusting, assigning, and empowering; some of the other words that are made from this root are توكل (tawakkala, tawakkul) and وكالة (wikāla).

References

Arabic language
Arabic words and phrases